Happiness Is You is the 24th album by country singer Johnny Cash, released on Columbia Records in 1966 (see 1966 in music). It contains, among others, "Guess Things Happen That Way", a re-recording of one of Cash's earliest Sun songs. The record reached #10 on the Country charts.  The LP was originally to be titled "That's What You Get For Lovin' Me", taking its title from the Gordon Lightfoot tune included in the album, and promo copies and some early commercial pressings show this title on the label.

The album was never released on cassette and did not finally see release on CD until 2012, as part of the box set Johnny Cash: The Complete Columbia Album Collection.

Track listing

Personnel 

 Johnny Cash - vocals, guitar
 Luther Perkins - guitar
 Norman Blake - guitar, dobro
 Bob Johnson - guitar, flute
 Marshall Grant - bass
 W.S. Holland - drums
 Bill Pursell - piano
 Maybelle Carter - autoharp
 The Carter Family, The Statler Brothers - backing vocals

Charts 
Album - Billboard (United States)

References

External links 
 Luma Electronic entry on Happiness is You

1966 albums
Columbia Records albums
Johnny Cash albums